The mottled pug (Eupithecia exiguata) is a moth of the family Geometridae. The species was first described by Jacob Hübner in 1813. It is found across the Palearctic region apart from around the Mediterranean Sea. It is common in the British Isles apart from Scotland where it is rather local.

The wingspan is 20–22 mm and the long and pointed forewings are brown or yellowish grey marked with pale radial lines and a large, somewhat oval black discal spot. The most characteristic markings are the strong black dashes on the radial and median veins where they cross the postmedian band The hindwings are cream or grey also with a discal spot. The larva is green with lozenge-shaped red dorsal spots. 
 
The species flies at night in May and June and is attracted to light, sometimes in large numbers.

The larva feeds on the foliage of various trees and shrubs (see list below). The species overwinters as a pupa.

Subspecies
Eupithecia exiguata exiguata
Eupithecia exiguata muricolor Prout, 1938

Recorded food plants 
Acer – sycamore
Berberis
Crataegus – hawthorn
Lonicera – honeysuckle
Malus – apple
Prunus
Ribes – redcurrant
Sorbus – rowan

References 

Chinery, Michael Collins Guide to the Insects of Britain and Western Europe 1986 (Reprinted 1991)
Skinner, Bernard Colour Identification Guide to Moths of the British Isles 1984

External links

Mottled pug at UKMoths
Lepiforum e.V.

Eupithecia
Moths described in 1813
Moths of Europe
Taxa named by Jacob Hübner